East Ithaca is a suburban community (and census-designated place) in Tompkins County, New York, United States. The population was 2,231 at the 2010 census.

East Ithaca is a suburb of the City of Ithaca on its eastern city line and in the Town of Ithaca. East Ithaca is immediately south of the main campus of Cornell University.

Geography
East Ithaca is located at  (42.426717, -76.459066).

East Ithaca is near the south end of Cayuga Lake, just east of the City of Ithaca. While known as East Ithaca, it is also considered to be part of East Hill, a designation shared with the contiguous area within the City of Ithaca

Demographics

As of the census of 2000, there were 2,192 people, 1,017 households, and 474 families residing in the CDP. The population density was 1,264.2 per square mile (489.2/km2). There were 1,061 housing units at an average density of 611.9/sq mi (236.8/km2). The racial makeup of the CDP was 76.09% White, 2.74% African American, 0.23% Native American, 17.24% Asian, 0.09% Pacific Islander, 1.23% from other races, and 2.37% from two or more races. Hispanic or Latino of any race were 3.56% of the population.

There were 1,017 households, out of which 19.4% had children under the age of 18 living with them, 39.2% were married couples living together, 5.8% had a female householder with no husband present, and 53.3% were non-families. 31.7% of all households were made up of individuals, and 7.1% had someone living alone who was 65 years of age or older. The average household size was 2.16 and the average family size was 2.66.

In the CDP, the population was spread out, with 15.2% under the age of 18, 15.0% from 18 to 24, 41.0% from 25 to 44, 18.9% from 45 to 64, and 9.9% who were 65 years of age or older. The median age was 31 years. For every 100 females, there were 104.5 males. For every 100 females age 18 and over, there were 103.1 males.

The median income for a household in the CDP was $37,500, and the median income for a family was $56,742. Males had a median income of $38,676 versus $25,125 for females. The per capita income for the CDP was $23,988. About 1.5% of families and 15.1% of the population were below the poverty line, including none of those under the age of eighteen or sixty-five or over.

References

Census-designated places in New York (state)
Census-designated places in Tompkins County, New York